Brentham for North Ealing and Greystoke Park was a railway station in Park Royal, London, on the New North Main Line. The station opened as Brentham on 1 May 1911 as a replacement for Twyford Abbey Halt. The name was changed to Brentham (for North Ealing) in 1932 and was later extended further to include "Greystoke Park". It closed on 15 June 1947 in advance of the opening of the extension of the Central Line from North Acton to Greenford on 30 June 1947. It was replaced by Hanger Lane.

References

Former Great Western Railway stations
Disused railway stations in the London Borough of Ealing
Park Royal
Railway stations in Great Britain opened in 1911
Railway stations in Great Britain closed in 1915
Railway stations in Great Britain opened in 1920
Railway stations in Great Britain closed in 1947